McMorran or MacMorran is a surname. Recorded as O'Morahan, O'Moran, McMorran, Moran, Morran, Morahan and others, it is possibly of Irish origin. Moran, Morin, and Morain are also recorded in France, Ireland and England.

Notable people with the surname include:

Donald McMorran (1904–1965), English architect
Eddie McMorran (1923–1984), Northern Ireland footballer
Henry McMorran (1844–1929), American politician and businessman
John MacMorran (died 1595), Scottish merchant and murder victim
John McMorran (1934–2001), Scottish footballer

Places
Places named after people called McMorran include:

McMorran Place, entertainment complex in Port Huron, Michigan, United States
The McMorran and Washburne Department Store Building, a commercial building in Eugene, Oregon, US
 

Scottish Gaelic masculine surnames